Jules Danglot (born 6 August 2001) is a French rugby union player. His position is scrum-half and he currently plays for Toulon in the Top 14.

Danglot played for Montpellier Hérault Rugby youth squads. He began his professional career with Montpellier Hérault in 2020. He was signed by Toulon in June 2021.

References

External links
 All rugby profile
 It's rugby Profile
 EPCR Profile

2001 births
Living people
French rugby union players
Sportspeople from Montpellier
Montpellier Hérault Rugby players
RC Toulonnais players
Rugby union fly-halves
Rugby union scrum-halves